Pandav Pratap is a devotional literature composed by Shridhar Swami Nazarekar (1658-1729), a popular Marathi poet in the 17th-18th centuries.

References

Hindu texts
Marathi-language literature
Cultural history of India